In mathematics, the field of definition of an algebraic variety V is essentially the smallest field to which the coefficients of the polynomials defining V can belong. Given polynomials, with coefficients in a field K, it may not be obvious whether there is a smaller field k, and other polynomials defined over k, which still define V.

The issue of field of definition is of concern in diophantine geometry.

Notation

Throughout this article, k denotes a field.  The algebraic closure of a field is denoted by adding a superscript of "alg", e.g. the algebraic closure of k is kalg.  The symbols Q, R, C, and Fp represent, respectively, the field of rational numbers, the field of real numbers, the field of complex numbers, and the finite field containing p elements.  Affine n-space over a field F is denoted by An(F).

Definitions for affine and projective varieties

Results and definitions stated below, for affine varieties, can be translated to projective varieties, by replacing An(kalg) with projective space of dimension n − 1 over kalg, and by insisting that all polynomials be homogeneous.

A k-algebraic set is the zero-locus in An(kalg) of a subset of the polynomial ring k[x1, ..., xn].  A k-variety is a k-algebraic set that is irreducible, i.e. is not the union of two strictly smaller k-algebraic sets.  A k-morphism is a regular function between k-algebraic sets whose defining polynomials' coefficients belong to k.

One reason for considering the zero-locus in An(kalg) and not An(k) is that, for two distinct k-algebraic sets X1 and X2, the intersections X1∩An(k) and X2∩An(k) can be identical; in fact, the zero-locus in An(k) of any subset of k[x1, ..., xn] is the zero-locus of a single element of k[x1, ..., xn] if k is not algebraically closed.

A k-variety is called a variety if it is absolutely irreducible, i.e. is not the union of two strictly smaller kalg-algebraic sets.  A variety V is defined over k if every polynomial in kalg[x1, ..., xn] that vanishes on V is the linear combination (over kalg) of polynomials in k[x1, ..., xn] that vanish on V.  A k-algebraic set is also an L-algebraic set for infinitely many subfields L of kalg.  A field of definition of a variety V is a subfield L of kalg such that V is an L-variety defined over L.

Equivalently, a k-variety V is a variety defined over k if and only if the function field k(V) of V is a regular extension of k, in the sense of Weil. That means every subset of k(V) that is linearly independent over k is also linearly independent over kalg. In other words those extensions of k are linearly disjoint.

André Weil proved that the intersection of all fields of definition of a variety V is itself a field of definition. This justifies saying that any variety possesses a unique, minimal field of definition.

Examples

 The zero-locus of x12+ x22 is both a Q-variety and a Qalg-algebraic set but neither a variety nor a Qalg-variety, since it is the union of the Qalg-varieties defined by the polynomials x1 + ix2 and x1 - ix2.
 With Fp(t) a transcendental extension of Fp, the polynomial x1p- t equals (x1 - t1/p) p in the polynomial ring (Fp(t))alg[x1].  The Fp(t)-algebraic set V defined by x1p- t is a variety; it is absolutely irreducible because it consists of a single point.  But V is not defined over Fp(t), since V is also the zero-locus of x1 - t1/p.<div>
 The complex projective line is a projective R-variety.  (In fact, it is a variety with Q as its minimal field of definition.)  Viewing the real projective line as being the equator on the Riemann sphere, the coordinate-wise action of complex conjugation on the complex projective line swaps points with the same longitude but opposite latitudes.
 The projective R-variety W defined by the homogeneous polynomial x12+ x22+ x32 is also a variety with minimal field of definition Q.  The following map defines a C-isomorphism from the complex projective line to W: (a,b) → (2ab, a2-b2, -i(a2+b2)).  Identifying W with the Riemann sphere using this map, the coordinate-wise action of complex conjugation on W interchanges opposite points of the sphere.  The complex projective line cannot be R-isomorphic to W because the former has real points, points fixed by complex conjugation, while the latter does not.

Scheme-theoretic definitions

One advantage of defining varieties over arbitrary fields through the theory of schemes is that such definitions are intrinsic and free of embeddings into ambient affine n-space.

A k-algebraic set is a separated and reduced scheme of finite type over Spec(k).  A k-variety is an irreducible k-algebraic set.  A k-morphism is a morphism between k-algebraic sets regarded as schemes over Spec(k).

To every algebraic extension L of k, the L-algebraic set associated to a given k-algebraic set V is the fiber product of schemes V ×Spec(k) Spec(L).  A k-variety is absolutely irreducible if the associated kalg-algebraic set is an irreducible scheme; in this case, the k-variety is called a variety.  An absolutely irreducible k-variety is defined over k if the associated kalg-algebraic set is a reduced scheme.  A field of definition of a variety V is a subfield L of kalg such that there exists a k∩L-variety W such that W ×Spec(k∩L) Spec(k) is isomorphic to V and the final object in the category of reduced schemes over W ×Spec(k∩L) Spec(L) is an L-variety defined over L.

Analogously to the definitions for affine and projective varieties, a k-variety is a variety defined over k if the stalk of the structure sheaf at the generic point is a regular extension of k; furthermore, every variety has a minimal field of definition.

One disadvantage of the scheme-theoretic definition is that a scheme over k cannot have an L-valued point if L is not an extension of k.  For example, the rational point (1,1,1) is a solution to the equation x1 + ix2 - (1+i)x3 but the corresponding Q[i]-variety V has no Spec(Q)-valued point.  The two definitions of field of definition are also discrepant, e.g. the (scheme-theoretic) minimal field of definition of V is Q, while in the first definition it would have been Q[i].  The reason for this discrepancy is that the scheme-theoretic definitions only keep track of the polynomial set up to change of basis.  In this example, one way to avoid these problems is to use the Q-variety Spec(Q[x1,x2,x3]/(x12+ x22+ 2x32- 2x1x3 - 2x2x3)), 
whose associated Q[i]-algebraic set is the union of the Q[i]-variety Spec(Q[i][x1,x2,x3]/(x1 + ix2 - (1+i)x3)) and its complex conjugate.

Action of the absolute Galois group

The absolute Galois group Gal(kalg/k) of k naturally acts on the zero-locus in An(kalg) of a subset of the polynomial ring k[x1, ..., xn].  In general, if V is a scheme over k (e.g. a k-algebraic set), Gal(kalg/k) naturally acts on V ×Spec(k) Spec(kalg) via its action on Spec(kalg).

When V is a variety defined over a perfect field k, the scheme V can be recovered from the scheme V ×Spec(k) Spec(kalg) together with the action of Gal(kalg/k) on the latter scheme:  the sections of the structure sheaf of V on an open subset U are exactly the sections of the structure sheaf of V ×Spec(k) Spec(kalg) on U ×Spec(k) Spec(kalg) whose residues are constant on each Gal(kalg/k)-orbit in U ×Spec(k) Spec(kalg).  In the affine case, this means the action of the absolute Galois group on the zero-locus is sufficient to recover the subset of k[x1, ..., xn] consisting of vanishing polynomials.

In general, this information is not sufficient to recover V.  In the example of the zero-locus of x1p- t in (Fp(t))alg, the variety consists of a single point and so the action of the absolute Galois group cannot distinguish whether the ideal of vanishing polynomials was generated by x1 - t1/p, by x1p- t, or, indeed, by x1 - t1/p raised to some other power of p.

For any subfield L of kalg and any L-variety V, an automorphism σ of kalg will map V isomorphically onto a σ(L)-variety.

Further reading

 
 The terminology in this article matches the terminology in the text of Fried and Jarden, who adopt Weil's nomenclature for varieties.  The second edition reference here also contains a subsection providing a dictionary between this nomenclature and the more modern one of schemes.
 
 Kunz deals strictly with affine and projective varieties and schemes but to some extent covers the relationship between Weil's definitions for varieties and Grothendieck's definitions for schemes.
 
 Mumford only spends one section of the book on arithmetic concerns like the field of definition, but in it covers in full generality many scheme-theoretic results stated in this article.

Diophantine geometry